Mikkel Bjørn Sørensen (born 19 October 1995) is a Danish politician and schoolteacher who since January 2023 has been a member of the Folketing for the Danish People's Party. From October 2016 to October 2021 he served as the first national chairman of his former party's youth wing Nye Borgerliges Ungdom. In April 2022 he became lead candidate for Nye Borgerlige on Funen for the up-coming election after previously having run in the municipal elections in Vejle Municipality and the 2019 general election in South Jutland Constituency. At the 2022 general election he was elected a member of the Folketing. He currently lives in Nyborg on Funen. Before he entered Parliament he taught history, Danish, social studies, and Christianity. Bjørn Sørensen has been described as having belonged to the more conservative branch of Nye Borgerlige.

Youth politics

Young Conservatives 
Mikkel Bjørn Sørensen began in Young Conservatives (Konservativ Ungdom), where he became local chairman for KU Vejle. He belonged to the national conservative White Wing (Hvid Fløj) in the youth wing. In 2016 he was, along two other members of KU, expelled, allegedly after in a closed Facebook group having evinced that they did not wish to vote for the Conservative People's Party (Det Konservative Folkeparti), which was considered disloyal. At KU's national council, accoring to Mikkel Bjørn Sørensen himself, about 140 voted in favor of and 112 against his expulsion.

Nye Borgerliges Ungdom 

In October 2016 Mikkel Bjørn Sørensen was elected the first chairman of Nye Borgerliges Ungdom (NBU). During his time as youth leader he lead his organisation through three so-called school elections in 2017, 2019 and 2021 with Nye Borgerlige gaining 1.4 %, 1.5 % and 3.6 % at each of thoese elections respectively.

At the 2017 local elections, Bjørn Sørensen ran for Nye Borgerlige in Vejle Municipality reciving 33 personal votes and Nye Borgerlige failing to acquire a seat in that municipality. In the 2019 general election he ran in South Jutland gaining 46 personal votes with Pernille Vermund by virtue of her 13,391 personal votes securing the one Nye Borgerlige seat in South Jutland.

In October 2021, he was succeeded by Malte Larsen. As Bjørn Sørensen would later leave Nye Borgerlige on 24 January 2023, Larsen as well as the NBU's deputy chairman Mitchel Oliver Vestergaard also left the party on the very same day. Both Larsen and Vestergaard would later also join the DF during February 2023.

Political career

Nye Borgerlige 

In April 2022, Bjørn Sørensen was appointed as the party's lead candidate on Funen for the up-coming general election. In an interview to Danish magazine Euroman during the election campaign, he explained that he in 2019, unlike this time, had run with no ambition of reaching election having been occupied with writing Bachelor's degree. At the 2022 general election he was elected a member of the Folketing with 888 personal votes as one out of six MPs for Nye Borgerlige. From his election to the Folketing until his party exit he served as deputy chairman for Nye Borgerlige's parliamentary group. He is known for stating controversial opinions on Twitter, for instance calling modern feminism "a cancerous tumor on society". On 5 January he received the title of chairman of the Naturalisation Committee (Indfødsretsudvalget) in which context he i.a. said:

Following Nye Borgerlige leader Pernille Vermund's announcement to resign on 10 January 2023, several news media predicted Mikkel Bjørn Sørensen alongside Lars Boje Mathiesen to be the two main contesters in the up-coming leadership election, although neither had announced their intention to run.

Danish People's Party 

On an extraordinary meeting in the party's main board (hovedbestyrelse) on 17 January, it was decided that the new leader would be elected at an extraordinary annual meeting held on 7 February as well as Boje Mathiesen announcing his candidacy. It was further announced that the deadline for announcing one's candidacy would be the 24 January. On that day, Bjørn Sørensen left Nye Borgerlige and immeadietly joined Danish People's Party (Dansk Folkeparti) attributing internal dissagrements and a lack of belief in Boje's abilities to lead as the reason. The chairman of Danish People's Party Morten Messerschmidt welcomed him stating, "Mikkel Bjørn is an excellent and conservative nationally rooted politician who has God, king and fatherland tattooed right into his heart". The following day, it was announced that no other candidate than Boje had entered the race whereby he subsequently took office as leader of Nye Borgerlige on 7 February 2022 with Henriette Ergemann as deputy leader. On 6 February former Nye Borgerlige MP Mette Thiesen also joined the DF, having been an independent in the Folketing since 7 November.

References

External links 
 Mikkel Bjørn Sørensen's personal website
 Biography on the Danish Parliament's website
 Mikkel Bjørn Sørensen's articles in Årsskriftet Critique

The New Right (Denmark) politicians
1995 births
Living people
Members of the Folketing 2022–2026